Abdullah Bin Salleh (born 2 September 1948) is a Saudi Arabian football (soccer) player who played as a defender for Al-Nassr.

References

Living people
Saudi Arabian footballers
1948 births
Sportspeople from Riyadh
Al Nassr FC players
Saudi Professional League players
Association football defenders